This is a list of albums and released under Star Empire Entertainment record label.

2000s

2001–2003

2004

2005

2006–2007

2008

2009

2010s

2010

2011

2012

2013

2014

2015

2016

2017

2018

2019

2020

References 

Discographies of South Korean record labels
Pop music discographies